The 1968–69 Toledo Rockets men's basketball team represented University of Toledo as a member of the Mid-American Conference during the 1968–69 NCAA University Division men's basketball season.

Roster

Schedule

Team players drafted into the NBA

References 

1968–69 Mid-American Conference men's basketball season
1968–69
Toledo Rockets men's basketball
Toledo Rockets men's basketball